The Philippine National Police Maritime Group (PNP-MG) is a National Operational Support Unit (NOSU) of the Philippine National Police mandated to perform all police functions, ensure public safety and internal security over Philippine territorial waters, rivers and coastal areas to include ports and harbors and sustain the protection of the maritime environment. 
The unit was created along with the PNP by virtue of Republic Act RA 6975 otherwise known as Department of the Interior and Local Government Act of 1990 (Section 35.b.1):

History

The concept of a maritime police unit emanated during the days of Philippine Constabulary that led to the creation of a seaborne battalion called Constabulary Off-Shore Anti-Crime Battalion (COSAC) on February 1, 1971. The COSAC was tasked to suppress all criminal activities that affects the environment. After the establishment of the Philippine National Police through Republic Act 6975, the Maritime Police Command (MARICOM) was created on January 16, 1991, by virtue of NHQ Philippine National Police General Orders No. 58 as one of the National Support Units of the PNP. The original members of the Maritime Command are personnel of Philippine Constabulary, Philippine Navy, Integrated National Police and Philippine Coast Guard. On September 12, 1996, the National Police Commission (Philippines) issued the Resolution No.96-058, changing the name of the Maritime Police Command (MARICOM) to Maritime Group (MG).

Mission
To perform all police functions and ensure public safety and internal security over Philippine territorial waters and rivers including ports of entry and exit; and sustain the protection of the maritime environment.

Specifically, PNP-MG has the following functions:
To train, equip, mobilize, organize and manage resources for effective maritime law enforcement and internal security operations;
To enforce all laws, rules, regulations and ordinances relative to the protection of lives, properties and environment;
To arrest, investigate and assist in the prosecution of terrorists, smuggling, drug traffickers and other criminal element;
To conduct search and rescue operations.

Legal basis
As an integral part of the PNP, Maritime Group shares PNP’s mandates, albeit on a more specific territorial jurisdiction. While the PNP is mandated to perform all police functions all over the Philippines’ national territory, including but not limited to the land and water territories, Maritime Group’s mandate generally applies only in the Philippine territorial waters and rivers including ports of entry and exit. These mandate and jurisdiction were anchored on the following legal bases:

1987 Philippine Constitution
The 1987 Philippine Constitution mandated the creation of one national police force that is civilian in character. Today, that national police force came out to become the Philippine National Police (PNP). The national scope of the PNP draws its definition from the Article I of this Constitution, stating that:

″The National Territory comprises the Philippine archipelago, with all the islands and waters embraced therein, and all other territories over which the Philippines has sovereignty or jurisdiction, consisting of its terrestrial, fluvial and aerial domains, including its territorial sea, the seabed, the subsoil, the insular shelves, and other submarine areas.″ 

It shows that as the national scope of the PNP covers the national territory, the jurisdiction where its police functions would apply covers not only the land but also on aerial and sea territories of the country. Incidentally, Maritime Group is the arm of the PNP having jurisdiction in the sea territory of the country.

Republic Act No. 6975 and its IRR
The passing into law of RA 6975 on December 13, 1990, merged and reorganized the PC/INP. This resulted in the dissolution of the Philippine Constabulary and the creation of the Philippine National Police. The Maritime Group was created under the same law as one of the PNP’s National Operational Support Units.

Creation of a Maritime Police Unit
Section 32.b (1) of RA 6975 and its IRR created the "Maritime Police Unit headed by a Director with the rank of Chief Superintendent  (that) shall perform all police functions over Philippine territorial waters and rivers including ports of entry and exit". This Maritime Police Unit evolved to become the Maritime Group as it exists now. The scope of PNP covers the national territory, not only on the terrestrial but includes the maritime domain. As the sole national police of the country, the PNP has absorbed, assumed and taken-over the police function of the Coast Guard under this law.

Absorption, Assumption and Take-over by PNP of the Police Function of Coast Guard
Section 24 of RA 6975 provided the various police function of PNP and the additional functions absorbed from different agencies, in an effort to comply with the constitutional requirement that there shall be one national police force. This section specified the Powers and Functions of the PNP. It also requires that “the PNP shall absorb… the police functions of the Coast Guard.”

Section 86 of the law reiterated this as it provides the Assumption by the PNP of Police Functions. This provision mandates that “the police functions of the Coast Guard shall be taken over by the PNP.”  Effectively, these provisions of the law dissolved the police functions of these agencies, Coast Guard included. To date this day, no law repealed these provisions.

Specifically, the absorption and take-over of police functions are viewed as a move to comply with the constitutional mandate that there shall only be one police force in the country. Generally, it is understood that the police function of the Coast Guard that was absorbed and taken-over by the PNP, has been vested upon and assumed by the Maritime Group as it performs these functions to this day.

Organization
The unit is currently headed by Police Brigadier General Harold B. Tuzon as D,MG (Director, Maritime Group). The Command Group is composed of Police Colonel Genaro V. Sapiera - Deputy Director for Administration, Police Colonel JacobG. Macabali - Deputy Director for Operations, and Police Colonel Jonathan M Tangonan - Chief of Staff.
 
Today, the PNP Maritime Group is organized into  17 Regional Maritime Units (RMUs) and four (4) Special Operations Units (SOUs).

Regional Maritime Unit
RMUs are present in all the 17 regions of the country. Their mandated tasks include:
 Provide support to the Police Regional Offices (PROAs) by conducting anti-criminality, public safety internal security and anti-terrorism operations in the maritime environment;
 Enforce environmental and maritime laws; and
 To conduct tactical boat operations and maritime investigations.

Special Operations Unit
In response to the increasing number of criminal activities committed at sea, the National Police Commission (Philippines) approved the activation of Three (3) Special Operations Units (SOUs) under the direct operational and administrative control of PNP Maritime Group. These units are envisioned to protect the territorial waters of the Philippines by providing rapid and highly mobile seaborne law enforcement response.

The operational jurisdiction of these SOUs are as follows:
 1st SOU-MG - maritime areas of Basilan, Sulu, Tawi-Tawi and Isabela City;
 2nd SOU-MG - maritime areas of Palawan Province and the Visayas; and 
 3rd SOU-MG - maritime areas of Luzon including the Batanes Islands.

Current rank structure and classification (2019–present) 
As of February 8, 2019, a new rank structure and classification for the Philippine National Police was adopted, eliminating the confusion with the old ranks.

 The enabling law for the ranking is Republic Act 11200 which was signed by President Rodrigo Duterte, amending the section of the Department of the Interior and Local Government Act of 1990 that refers to the ranking classification of the Philippine National Police.

However, the usage of this classification internally by the PNP was put on hold in March 2019 during the creation of rules and regulations (IRR) of the rank classification, which determined how each rank would be officially abbreviated. The new rank abbreviations and the IRR of the new rank system officially took effect on March 25, 2019.

Full set of ranks 
Per the current (2019) rank system, the National Police has no rank holders of Second Lieutenant, Technical Sergeant, Sergeant and Patrolman First Class.

Sea assets

Operational accomplishments

The PNP Maritime Group is very active in the conduct of maritime law enforcement operations which resulted to several notable operational accomplishments. The unit is focused on preventing and/or arresting dynamite and cyanide fishers, wildlife law violators and foreign commercial vessels that are intruding in the country. For 2014, the unit accomplished the following:
arrest of 36 persons  for violating Forestry Law of the Philippines;
seizure of Php 2 million (41,220.54 US Dollar) worth of illegally cut timber and other forest product;
arrest of 23 foreigners ( including 11 Vietnamese and 11 Chinese nationals) for violations of fisheries and wildlife laws of the Philippines;
confiscation of Php 7 million (144,271.89 US Dollar) worth of illegally caught fish and other wildlife products; and 
the poachers paying US$2 million in administrative fines to the government.
The PNP-MG confiscated an estimated Php107 million worth (2.2 million US Dollar) of evidence.

Maritime Group's Role in the Battle of Marawi
The PNP Maritime Group deployed one of its patrol craft, the Police Fast Boat (PFB)221 with personnel complement from its Regional Maritime Unit (RMU) 12 in General Santos City, MG-Special Operations Unit 1 from Tawi-Tawi, and RMU 10 from Cagayan de Oro City. The PNP MG personnel is part of the combined security forces composed of Philippine Navy and Philippine Coast Guard in securing the vicinity of Lake Lanao in Marawi. Their role in securing the lake is not easy as they were in the receiving end of sniper shots.

For their service in the conflict, Sixteen PNP MG personnel were meritoriously promoted for their service in the Marawi siege.

Chinese Fishermen Poaching of more than 500 Sea turtles in Palawan
On May 6, 2014, a PNP Maritime Group patrol intercepted a Chinese fishing vessel loaded with about 500 live and dead Sea turtles, of assorted species, off the coast of Western Palawan.  Nine (9) Chinese fishermen were arrested and later charged for violations of Fishery and Wildlife laws of the Philippines. A total of 555 Sea turtles were recovered based on the inventory of the PNP Maritime Group. Of these total, 177 were alive and were released immediately back to wild. The maritime police investigators also discovered that 207 sea turtles were slaughtered and stuffed by the Chinese fishermen.

Vietnamese Fishermen arrested for poaching

On October 21, 2013, 13 Vietnamese fishermen were arrested for poaching and illegal entry. Upon inspection of their cargo hold, Maritime Group personnel discovered an undetermined number of Sea turtles, mostly slaughtered for meat and frozen in the onboard refrigerators. The Vietnamese poachers were detained and later charged in court for violations of Philippine Fisheries Law.
The maritime police operatives discovered about 50 assorted dead sharks, including great white sharks, bull sharks and hammerhead sharks, all believed to be caught in Philippine waters. They were charged in court for violations of Philippine Fisheries Law.

See also
Philippine Coast Guard

References

Law enforcement in the Philippines
Philippine National Police
Maritime law enforcement agencies